Alberta Provincial Highway No. 21A, commonly referred to as Highway 21A, was the designation of two former spur routes of Highway 21 in Alberta, Canada.

Southern segment 

It was established in 1958/59 when Highway 21 was realigned from Beiseker to Highway 1 (Trans-Canada Highway) east of Strathmore. Highway 21A was renumbered to Highway 26 in 1962/63, and in 1972/73 the north-south section became Highway 806 while the east-west section became Highway 575.

Northern segment 

The northern section of Highway 21A was a  highway that connected Highway 21 with Highway 12 near the Hamlet of Nevis.  In the early-1990s, Highway 11 was extended east from Highway 815 near Joffre to Highway 21; when construction was completed, Highway 21A became part of Highway 11.

References 

021A
021A